Thomas Fairfoul (16 January 1881 – 1952) was a Scottish footballer who played as a right-half.

Born in West Calder, West Lothian, Fairfoul made over 200 senior appearances in Scottish football, playing for Kilmarnock and Third Lanark, before moving south of the border to join Liverpool in 1913. He spent two years with the club, where his fortunes were mixed. He played in the 1914 FA Cup Final, ending on the losing side, but was later suspended by the FA for his involvement in the betting scandal of 1915. Fairfoul was re-instated after the break for World War I but did not return to football.

References

External links
Profile at LFCHistory.net

1881 births
1952 deaths
Scottish footballers
Association football wing halves
Kilmarnock F.C. players
Third Lanark A.C. players
Liverpool F.C. players
Footballers from West Lothian
Scottish Football League players
Scottish Football League representative players
English Football League players
Sportspeople involved in betting scandals
FA Cup Final players
People from West Calder